The 2013 Mudsummer Classic (formally the CarCash Mudsummer Classic presented by CNBC Prime's The Profit) was a NASCAR Camping World Truck Series stock car race held on July 24, 2013, at Eldora Speedway in New Weston, Ohio. The race was the first dirt track race held by a NASCAR national touring series (Cup, Xfinity, Trucks) since 1970. Contested over 150 laps, the race was the tenth of the 2013 NASCAR Camping World Truck Series season. Ken Schrader of self-owned Ken Schrader Racing won the pole position, and became the oldest pole sitter in NASCAR history at 58 years of age. Austin Dillon of Richard Childress Racing won the race, while Kyle Larson and Ryan Newman finished second and third, respectively.

The qualifying procedure was unique for the race; drivers' qualifying times set the starting grids for five heat races to determine the feature race's starting lineup, while the top five of a last chance qualifier (LCQ) advance to the feature. Schrader, Jared Landers, Timothy Peters, Kenny Wallace and Jeb Burton won the heat races, while Brennan Newberry won the LCQ. The feature's format was also distinctive compared to other NASCAR events, as it was divided into three segments, lasting 60, 50 and 40 laps. In the feature, Larson took the lead from Peters on lap 39, and later battled with Dillon for the win, and Dillon claimed the victory after he retained the lead on the green–white–checker finish for his fifth career Truck Series win.

Background
The last race run on dirt in a NASCAR national touring series occurred on September 30, 1970, at the North Carolina State Fairgrounds in Raleigh in a Grand National Series race, which was won by Richard Petty. Afterwards, NASCAR sanctioned the Busch All-Star Tour, a dirt late model series, which lasted from 1985 to 2002.

Eldora Speedway, which opened in 1954, is a 0.5 mile (0.80 km) oval with turns at a 24 degree banking, while the straightaways are 8 degrees. The track's grandstands can fit 17,782 spectators, and the hillside seating can fit an unlimited number of fans.

On October 15, 2012, track owner Tony Stewart and Austin Dillon held a private test at the track, driving trucks. On November 28, NASCAR announced that Eldora Speedway would be on the schedule as the first of two Wednesday Truck races, along with the UNOH 200 at Bristol Motor Speedway for 2013. Although the track does not have any SAFER barriers, Tom Gideon, NASCAR Director of Safety, stated the track meets NASCAR regulations. By January 29, 2013, the 17,782 grandstand seats had been sold out, with purchasers from 48 states and six countries.

Various non-Truck regulars entered the race for reasons such as to help a team in the owners' championship, with teams hiring drivers who are familiar with dirt racing to assist them in the championship. Examples include dirt track specialists Scott Bloomquist, who won The Dream and the World 100 at the track six times and three times, respectively; Tracy Hines, who had 85 career wins, including six at Eldora, and 52 starts in the Truck Series; Jared Landers, who won 100 features in his career; J. R. Heffner, who won the big-block modified championship at Lebanon Valley Speedway twice; Jeff Babcock, who won an American Late Model Series race at the track during 2013; and Joe Cobb, a dirt modified racer and the father of Truck Series regular Jennifer Jo Cobb. Cup Series drivers Dave Blaney, Ken Schrader and Ryan Newman, along with Nationwide Series drivers Austin Dillon, Kenny Wallace and Kyle Larson also ran in the event. Babcock, Blaney, Bloomquist, Hines, Schrader and Wallace had all won races at Eldora in various disciplines. Jason Bowles was later announced as the driver of the No. 5 for Wauters Motorsports, while Chris Jones was originally listed as the driver of the No. 93 for RSS Racing, but eventually withdrew.

In preparation for the race, tire provider Goodyear created new tires, branded "Wrangler", based on a previous dirt tire that the company made. To give the trucks more grip, the tires were widened by one inch to eleven. The bias-ply tires (instead of radial tires) also had treads to remove dirt quicker, in a block pattern, along with being softer. The left-side tires were staggered three inches shorter to 85.5 inches than the right tires (88.5) to assist in handling. Meanwhile, the trucks had mesh shields and hood deflector screens attached to prevent debris from the dirt from entering the radiators and damaging the vehicles. The trucks also had the front spoilers and splitters removed, the grille closed, and the rear spoilers raised and enlarged by 40 square inches to generate more downforce. The trucks' windshields remained, meaning the track crew had to keep the track dry, to prevent mud from making them unable to be cleared. On the hoods, bug deflectors, which were 8 by 12 inches, were installed to prevent stones from hitting the windshield. Teams added under panels to the trucks' chassis to prevent dirt from increasing the trucks' weight.

Entering the race, Matt Crafton led the points standings with 357 points, followed by Jeb Burton and James Buescher, both with 319 and 317 points, respectively. Ty Dillon and Johnny Sauter finished the top five with 309 and 305 points, respectively. Ryan Blaney had 290 points, and behind him were Miguel Paludo (285), Timothy Peters (281), Brendan Gaughan (280) and Darrell Wallace Jr. (272).

Practice and qualifying

Practice
Two-hour practice sessions were held on July 23 from 4:30 to 6:30 P.M. EST, followed by another from 7:00 to 9:00 P.M, the latter being televised on Speed. Another practice was held the following day from 11:30 A.M. to 1:30 P.M.

The top five featured three Chevrolets and two Fords; the fastest Toyota driver was John Wes Townley (20.483 seconds), who was seventh-fastest.

In the second session, the top five consisted of three Chevrolets in the top three positions and Toyotas in fourth and fifth: Austin (21.644 seconds) and Ty Dillon (21.703 seconds), Larson (21.719 seconds), Ken Schrader (21.748 seconds) and Tracy Hines (21.753 seconds).

Qualifying

The field for the main event consisted only of 30 trucks instead of the usual 36, with the top 20 trucks in the owner's points standings guaranteed a spot. To determine the field, two-lap qualifying runs were held, which determined the starting grids for five heat races of eight laps each. The top five fastest qualifiers started on the pole for the heats, and the highest non-locked-in truck were transferred in to the main event until there were 25 trucks in the field. For drivers that did not qualify via the heats, the top four in a last-chance qualifier advance, with the final spot reserved for the most recent series champion, and if that spot is vacant, the fifth-place finisher in the LCQ would qualify for the main event.

The heat races began at 7:00 P.M., with each heat race occurring after 15 minutes of the previous heat's start. The last chance qualifier was held at 8:45 P.M. Schrader eventually won his heat race after leading all 8 laps. In Heat 2, the first caution flag of the day was flown for Darrell Wallace Jr.'s spin with three laps remaining, and Jared Landers prevented a comeback by Matt Crafton to win. The next heat was dominated by Timothy Peters, who led all eight laps; Heats 4 and 5 were won by Kenny Wallace and Jeb Burton, respectively, the two drivers leading every lap. In the last chance qualifier, J. R. Heffner, who started first in the race, failed to finish the race after completing one lap. Ultimately, Brennan Newberry led all fifteen laps to win, followed by Jeff Babcock, Jason Bowles and Justin Jennings. Norm Benning clinched the fifth and final transfer spot after holding off Clay Greenfield, who nearly wrecked him three times; in response, Benning gave Greenfield the finger after the race concluded. Because they did not finish in the top five, Greenfield, Jimmy Weller, Bryan Silas, Joe Cobb and Heffner did not qualify for the event. When asked about the duel with Greenfield, Benning stated Tony Stewart told him that he "singlehandedly made the show a success".

Qualifying results

Heat races

Heat Race #1

Heat Race #2

Heat Race #3

Heat Race #4

Heat Race #5

Last Chance Qualifier

Race

The race started at 9:35 P.M. EST and televised live on Speed, while being broadcast on radio by Motor Racing Network. Krista Voda hosted Speed's prerace show, while Rick Allen, Phil Parsons and Michael Waltrip called the race from the booth; the network's pit reporters for the event were Ray Dunlap, Hermie Sadler and Bob Dillner. 1.4 million people viewed the race on television, the tenth-most viewed Truck race in series history, and the highest-watched event of the day; the race also had a Nielsen rating of 1.20. The St. Henry High School band performed the national anthem, while the parade lap featured a four-wide salute by the trucks to the fans.

Due to the lack of a pit road, the race was split into three segments of 60, 50 and 40 laps so teams can make pit stops and adjustments between each segment, and there would be no positions gained nor lost during stops. In segment 1, Timothy Peters took the lead from pole-sitter Ken Schrader on lap 15, and led for 23 laps until Kyle Larson took the lead on lap 39, who led for the remainder of the segment. In the final five laps of the segment, the first caution of the race flew for debris, and the beneficiary was Max Gresham, who was the first driver at least a lap down, which allowed him to regain a lap. In the second segment, Larson continued to lead for a total of 50 laps until Austin Dillon passed him on lap 89 after the former collided with Germán Quiroga. One lap later, another caution was flown for debris, and Gresham was again the beneficiary. On lap 116, Jared Landers' truck became loose in turn 2, collected Ty Dillon and made contact with Johnny Sauter. Quiroga was the beneficiary on the resulting caution. Larson and Austin Dillon dueled for the remainder of the race, with Dillon allowing Larson to pass on lap 122, but Dillon managed to get past Larson on the following lap. Two more cautions for debris (first on the front stretch, the second in turn 4) were eventually flown, and a green–white–checker finish was initiated due to debris in turn 4 on lap 149. Dillon retained the lead on the GWC to win, beating Larson by 1.197 seconds. Behind Dillon and Larson, Ryan Newman finished third, followed by Joey Coulter, Brendan Gaughan, Timothy Peters, Darrell Wallace Jr., Matt Crafton, Dave Blaney and Max Gresham. Sauter (accident) and Jeff Babcock (engine) failed to finish the race.

The race concluded with four different leaders, eight lead changes, and six cautions. Dillon led the most laps with 64, followed by Larson (51), Peters (23) and Schrader (15). Despite winning the race, Dillon, along with six other drivers, did not receive Truck Series points due to a rule that allowed drivers to compete in only one series' drivers championship. The win was Dillon's first of 2013 and fifth Truck Series victory in 53 starts. It was also the 29th Truck Series win for owner Richard Childress and Richard Childress Racing's second Truck win of 2013.

In August, Dillon's truck, his winner's trophy and a jar of dirt he shoveled at the start/finish line were placed on display in the NASCAR Hall of Fame.

Results

Standings after the race

References

Mudsummer Classic
Mudsummer Classic
NASCAR races at Eldora Speedway